Friedrich Gerdes (12 December 1910 – 19 October 1960) was a German athlete. He competed in the men's javelin throw at the 1936 Summer Olympics. He was killed in a road accident in Berlin in 1960.

References

External links
 

1910 births
1960 deaths
Athletes (track and field) at the 1936 Summer Olympics
German male javelin throwers
Olympic athletes of Germany
People from Varel
Road incident deaths in Germany
Sportspeople from Lower Saxony